Long Days of Hate (Italian: I lunghi giorni dell'odio, also known as This Man Can't Die) is a 1968 Italian Spaghetti Western film co-written and directed by Gianfranco Baldanello.

Plot summary 
Martin Benson is a Civil War veteran and former outlaw earning money and clearing his name by working as an undercover agent for the US Army.  His infiltration of a ring supplying firearms and firewater to Indians has led to the capture and execution of three of the gang, though they would not identify the gang's ringleader.  Despite his monetary rewards and the three pistols and gun belts of the executed men that he has posted home to his father, who still believes him to be an outlaw, Benson wants no more of the undercover life.  Benson's controller, an Army Captain still wants him to continue his work in order to identify the ringleader and gain the Captain promotion.  Though the Captain has another agent, Tony Guy, the Captain prefers Benson's efficiency.

Outside the Army post Benson is unsuccessfully ambushed leading to more fatalities to the gang.  The gang decides to revenge themselves on Benson and draw him out by massacring Benson's family.  As Benson's sister Susy and two younger brothers are in town visiting Vic Graham who is romantically attracted to Susy, the gang strikes killing Benson's father and mother as well as a hired hand.  They also rape Benson's young sister Jenny who is left mute due to shock. Upon their return Daniel, the older brother spies an unidentified wounded man who they take to a cave to nurse back to health so he can identify who was responsible for the outrage.

Martin Benson returns home and together with Daniel carry out their own revenge, retaliation and retribution as well as discovering the identity of the ringleader.

Cast 
Guy Madison as Martin Benson
Lucienne Bridou as Susy Benson
Rik Battaglia as Vic Graham
Rosalba Neri as Melina (Martin's Girl)
Steve Merrick as Artie Benson
Anna Liotti as Jenny Benson
Gioia Desideri as Lillian
Alberto Dell'Acqua as Daniel Benson
Peter Martell as Tony Guy
Silvana Jachino as Mrs. Benson
Daniele Riccardi as Mr. Benson
Attilio Dottesio as Doctor Parker
John Bartha as Sheriff
Gaetano Scala as Starnish
Franco Gulà as John
Franco Pesce as Barnaby
Jlse Scholzel as Barnaby's wife
Giovanni Ivan Scratuglia as Bruce
Giovanni Querrel as Freight Clerk
Fortunato Arena as Jack

Soundtrack 
The film was the first score of Italian composer Amedeo Tommasi, and his only Spaghetti Western. One of Tommasi's themes in the film features an unidentified vocalist, three themes are repeated throughout the film played by guitar and piano. As was the custom of several Spaghetti Westerns, a track from Ennio Morricone's A Fistful of Dollars features in the film.

Notes

External links 

I lunghi giorni dell'odio at Variety Distribution

1968 films
1960s Italian-language films
1968 Western (genre) films
Spaghetti Western films
Films directed by Gianfranco Baldanello
1960s Italian films